Cordulegaster maculata, also known as the twin-spotted spiketail, is a dragonfly of the family Cordulegastridae. Its body length varies in size from 2.5 to 3.0 inches.  It was described by Edmond de Sélys Longchamps in 1854.

References

Cordulegastridae
Insects described in 1854